The WinCo Foods Portland Open was a golf tournament in Oregon on the Korn Ferry Tour. It debuted in August 2014 at Pumpkin Ridge Golf Club in North Plains, a suburb northwest of Portland. Northwest-based supermarket chain WinCo Foods was named as the title sponsor in June 2013. After a seven-year run, the tournament was removed from the Korn Ferry Tour schedule in 2021 due to WinCo Foods ending its title sponsorship.

With the exception of 2020 (when the season was altered due to the COVID-19 pandemic), the Portland Open was always the last regular-season event on the Korn Ferry Tour. Played on the Witch Hollow course, the tournament gave players one last chance to place in the top 25 on the money list to earn a PGA Tour card or play their way into the top 75 to retain full Korn Ferry Tour privileges and earn a chance at a PGA Tour card via the Korn Ferry Tour Finals.

Winners

Bolded players graduated to the PGA Tour via the Korn Ferry Tour regular season money list.

See also
Portland Open, a PGA Tour event from 1944 to 1966
Cambia Portland Classic, a current event on the LPGA Tour

References

External links
Coverage on the Korn Ferry Tour's official site

Former Korn Ferry Tour events
Golf in Oregon
Sports in Portland, Oregon
2014 establishments in Oregon
Recurring sporting events established in 2014